KLC is a rap music producer.

KLC may also refer to:

 KLC, the IATA code for Kaolack Airport in Senegal
 klc, the ISO-639-3 code for the Kolbila language of Cameroon and Nigeria
 KLC Ann Arbor (Koby Language Center), a private English language school in Michigan, USA
 K League Classic, the top tier of South Korea's professional association football leagues
 K League Challenge, the second tier of South Korea's professional association football leagues
Kennedy Launch Complex, alternative name of Kennedy Space Center Launch Complex 39
Kimberley Land Council, an association of Australian Aboriginal people
Kinesin light chain, part of a protein
King Ling College, a secondary school in Hong Kong
 Knights of the Lambda Calculus, a semi-fictional organization of expert LISP and Scheme hackers
 Kodiak Launch Complex, former name of Pacific Spaceport Complex – Alaska, a rocket launch facility in Alaska
 Karnataka Legislative Council, Upper house in the Indian state of Karnataka